The Craik Sustainable Living Project (CSLP) is a nonprofit organization for sustainable development that aims to advance the local use of more ecologically sound technologies and ways of living in rural Saskatchewan, Canada. The four key components of the project are the eco-centre, outreach and education programs, community action, and the ecovillage.

History
CSLP was created in 2001 from a partnership between the RM of Craik and the Town of Craik to develop a long-term plan for a sustainable community-based project. At the request of area resident Peter Farden of the Midlakes Community Coalition, Dr. Lynn Oliphant proposed a plan for the development of Saskatchewan's first ecovillage, which was adopted by community leaders. Four main areas of development were established to relate to sustainability.

Key activities

Eco-centre

The Eco-centre was a multipurpose facility that was built and designed as a focal point for the project. Local and recycled materials were incorporated whenever possible. The philosophy behind this type of construction is known as green building. Facilities included a restaurant, golf clubhouse, gift shop and three meeting rooms. The Eco-centre was destroyed by fire on March 24, 2016.

Outreach and education

CSLP supports Education for Sustainable Development, and is working to provide educational opportunities for children, youth and adults on climate change, renewable energy technologies, ecology, sustainable living and sustainable agriculture. The main projects involved have been the Sustainable Rural Alternatives Seminar Series, the creation of a resource library, and the Climate Change Awareness and Action Pilot Project in the Davidson School Division (which is now part of the Sun West School Division).  CSLP representatives have been invited to trade fairs, enviro-forums, ecofairs and other functions to highlight their work. Promotion of the project has also been advanced through the website, brochures, and articles written for local newspapers and other publications like the Regina EcoLiving Guide.

CSLP has also supported the participation of students in the Youth Forum on Sustainability Program, which has resulted in youth helping to organize a number of workshops for students from Grades K-12 including papermaking, vermicomposting and endangered species. Presenters of these workshops included experts from the University of Saskatchewan, the University of Regina, and HELP International.

Community action

The Craik Sustainable Living Project strives to motivate local people to reduce their ecological footprint. In addition to education initiatives, CSLP seeks funding and resources to support activities that increases energy efficiency of homes and vehicle use, reduce greenhouse gas emissions and introduce less contaminants into the environment. An example initiative is the no-idling policy in front of the town and municipal administration buildings.

Ecovillage

An access road to a  parcel of land was the first visible indication of the development of the ecovillage site in the fall of 2005. The first residents are planning to submit plans and begin construction in the following year. The mayor of the town of Craik at the time, Rod Haugerud, was the first to obtain a lot and begin construction of a straw bale home, but the lot has since been made available to Praxis International Institute. All of the original lots offered have been spoken for, with a second phase underway.  Applications are to include plans for energy efficient housing and systems to be built on-site within a year of submission. Future direction for community planning will come from the residents themselves.

Spin-offs and benefits

The project has attracted provincial and national attention, being featured in a number of print publications and television features including CBC's The National. Although receiving praise and awards from outside the community, the innovative approach to addressing rural decline and the need for sustainable living only recently received more widespread local public support after a petition was circulated to address concerns in devoting substantial efforts and resources to this project. In a heartfelt show of support, the assembled crowd rallied behind the mayor and members of the project, while also recognizing the value of the petitioner's concerns in drawing positive attention to the project, although inadvertently.

Some of the positive spinoffs of the project are still in the early stages, but include:

 while the anticipated construction of a multi-million hemp mill by Naturally Advanced Technologies Inc did not materialize, the site that would have been used by the mill has been purchased by Titan Clean Energy Projects, a project developer in renewable biomass energy.
 a revitalization of interest in developing tourism in the area, leading to support of projects such as a botanical garden, xeric garden and arboretum, walking and riding trails, and a bird viewing platform and interpretive area.
 attraction of new residents to a small Saskatchewan community, at a time when most small towns are experiencing steady declines.
 construction of a flax store, using strawbale construction, which offers a variety of flax-related products for sale
 increasing community awareness of sustainability through numerous workshops
 the planting of 64 000 fast growing hybrid poplars as part of an agroforestry program called Forest 2020.
 scheduled meetings as well as informal networking between politicians, environmental-activists, organic farmers, eco-tourists and other interested citizens in the restaurant and meeting rooms
 the development of a Green Map of the area

The project continues to act as a catalyst, capturing people's interest and imagination. This has been expressed in a number of ways, including a music festival in a hemp field, research into developing sustainable industries in the area, and an invitation to participate in the development of a Regional Centre of Expertise for research and education, with direction and involvement coming from two universities and the United Nations.

 CSLP depends on volunteer work, donations and fundraising efforts. Numerous grants have also been successfully applied for to support various projects, including the resource library and the Nature Gardens. CSLP administered the Craik Community - Midlakes Region One-Tonne Challenge, a federally funded program for climate change education and the reduction of CO2 emissions that was cut by the Harper Conservative Government in 2006 and has not yet been replaced with an alternative program.

Awards and recognition
February 17, 2005 - One Tonne Challenge Proposal accepted for the Craik Community-Mid-Lakes area
May 6, 2005 – FCM-CH2M HILL Sustainable Community Award for Community Engagement
June 12, 2005 - Canadian Geographic Canadian Environment Award to Lynn Oliphant
April 6, 2006 - Tourism Saskatchewan's Land of Living Skies Award of Excellence
2008-2012 - UN RCE Saskatchewan Recognition Awards for various initiatives

External links
 Craik Sustainable Living Project
 Federation of Canadian Municipalities Award to Craik for Citizen Engagement
 CSLP Resource Library Book List
 The Ecovillage Model

Articles
 "High on Hemp" - Explore, Winter '09
 "Little Footprint on the Prairie" - Briarpatch Magazine, Dec '08
 "Strategic Sustainability and Community Infrastructure Case Study #1, July '08
 Construction starts at Craik" - Canadian Cohousing Network, Summer '08 (page 8)
 "Craik home to eco-friendly school" - Saskatoon Star Phoenix, June '07
 "Living Off the Land" - VISTA Health Magazine, Jan/Feb '06
 "The Little Town That Could" -  Peace and Environment News, May/June '05
 "Saskatchewan's new eco-community" - Western Standard.ca, Feb. '05
 "From Dream to Eco-Reality" - Regina Eco-Living Guide, '05
 "Craik EcoVillage - a Model for Sustainable Living" - The Commonwealth, Dec '04
 "Prairie Town Goes Sustainable" - Natural Life Magazine,  Oct/Nov '04 (page 18)
 "Sustainable Living in Rural Saskatchewan" - Research paper for CorporateKnights
 "Craik Sustainable Living Project" - Saskatchewan's Environmental Champions

Video, television
 "Sustainability a la Craik" - Episode 10, Edifice and Us series
 "Craik: Building a Green Community - Episode 3, Green Life series
 "The Village Green” - ZootPictures Inc.

References

Environmental organizations based in Saskatchewan
Charities based in Canada
Ecovillages
2001 establishments in Saskatchewan
Non-profit organizations based in Saskatchewan